Trishul may refer to:

Film
Trishul (film), a 1978 Hindi film starring Sanjeev Kumar and Amitabh Bachchan
Trisulam (film), a 1982 Telugu film starring Krishnam Raju and Sridevi

Military
Trishul (missile), a surface-to-air missile developed in India by Defence Research and Development Organisation (DRDO)
INS Trishul, Indian Navy frigates
Trishula, a type of traditional trident from India

Moths
Trisula (moth), a moth genus of the family Noctuidae
Trisula variegata, a moth of the family Noctuidae
Trisula magnifica, a moth of the family Erebidae

Places

India
Tirsuli, a mountain peak in Himalayas
Tirsuli West, a mountain peak in Himalayas
Tirusulam, a neighborhood in Chennai, India
Tirusulam railway station, one of the railway stations of the Chennai Beach–Chengalpattu section of the Chennai Suburban Railway Network
Trishul Air-base, an Indian Air Force base
Trisul, a mountain peak in Himalayas

Nepal
Trishuli Hydropower Station, a run-of-the-river hydropower station in Rasuwa, Nepal
Trishuli River, a river in Rasuwa, Nepal